The Cádiz Bay tram-train is a tram-train/light rail system in the Spanish city of Cádiz and the surrounding area. The  system opened on October 26, 2022.

Background

The new tram-train line has been described by the European Commission as being 42% quicker than the train, and 26% faster than taking the car, along with projected reductions of 97% in traffic injuries and 75% in road deaths are foreseen. 

The line is also said to potentially decrease CO2 emissions 7,000 tonnes each year, and over 230,000 inhabitants who live within 500 metres of the line are expected to benefit.

Construction on the system began on September 1, 2008, but was halted due to the 2008–2014 Spanish financial crisis. The inaugural line will use the existing Alcázar de San Juan–Cádiz railway as far as La Ardila sharing stations with the Cercanías Cádiz commuter rail line, then transfer to a new tramway through to Chiclana de la Frontera; the first example of its kind in Spain, where trams use main-line railways.

The first completed units of the train-tram, which left CAF's facilities for the first time on April 24, 2012, were carrying out homologation tests in northern Spain. Between 2012 and 2014 CAF carried out tests with the train-trams between the stations of Irun and Alsasua. Later they moved to the surroundings of the Oviedo station.

In November 2014, the Andalusian government announced the arrival of the first unit in the province of Cádiz in order to carry out dynamic tests in the part of the route that was already completed. Thus, on November 17, 2014, the tram circulated for the first time between the stations of Ardila and Pinar de los Franceses, completing the route satisfactorily. The tests lasted throughout the entire week.

Test circulation and inauguration 
On February 11, 2022, for the first time, an 801 unit traveled the entire 24-kilometre route and 21 stops of the Tramway of the Bay, from the Pelagatos depot (Chiclana de la Frontera) to the Cádiz station. That same day, after this milestone, the Public Works Agency and Renfe announced that, before its entry into commercial service, scheduled for October 26, 2022, the blank tests were carried out, the robustness tests and, finally, the business simulations.

Finally, on October 21, 2022, the Andalusian government announced the inauguration date of the train-tram. On October 26, the Cádiz Bay tram-train was finally inaugurated, after more than 16 years since the works began and 20 years after its completion.

Future expansion
This line would eventually rejoin the mainline railway to serve Jerez de la Frontera and its airport.

Rolling stock

References

Tram transport in Spain
Light rail in Spain
Cádiz